Rear Admiral Handunnetti Rannulu Amaraweera, WV,  VSV, USP,  RWP,  RSP,  DSP,  RCDS (UK), Psc (USA). is a former Director Operations Sri Lanka Navy.

Early life
Amaraweera was educated at Nalanda College, Colombo. He was a keen cricketer and played for the Nalanda first XI team. Some of his teammates were Lalith Kaluperuma and Eastman Narangoda. Amaraweera's brothers former Minister H. R. Piyasiri and former Member of parliament H. R. Wimalasiri too played cricket for Nalanda.

Military career
After completing education at Nalanda, Amaraweera joined Sri Lanka Navy as a cadet officer and later was commissioned as a Sub Lieutenant. Staff College Course at US Naval War College, Newport RI, United States and Royal Collage of Defence Studies United Kingdom. During his Naval career, Amaraweera had held some key appointments such as Senior Officer Northern Naval Area, Commander Northern Naval Area,Commander Western Naval Area,  Commander of the Southern Naval, Director Naval  Operations, Director Naval Personal & Training. area, commander of the Western Naval area. After retirement at present, Rear Admiral H.R. Amaraweera is the Managing Director of Sri Lanka Land Reclamation and Development Corporation (LRDC) Security Services.

Eelam war
During Operation Balavegaya the then Captain Amaraweera commanded flotilla from
SLNS Edithara.
Operation Rivirasa 1995 - 1996. Commodore H.R Amaraweera as Commander Northern Naval Area was responsible for maintaining  uninterrupted logistical supply route (Northern Seas) midst heavy enemy resistance.

General references 

 HSZ in Muttur east to be reduced - Trinco hospital staff concerned over security
 Opposition accuse of military interference
 Rajapaksa Plans To Rig Polls with Help of Armymen: Opposition
 Gotabhaya to receive report that clears military
 Retired officers condemn CM's behaviour

Sri Lankan Buddhists
Alumni of Nalanda College, Colombo
Sri Lankan rear admirals
Sinhalese military personnel
Naval and Maritime Academy graduates
Living people
Year of birth missing (living people)